The Novikov conjecture is one of the most important unsolved problems in topology.  It is named for Sergei Novikov who originally posed the conjecture in 1965.

The Novikov conjecture concerns the homotopy invariance of certain polynomials in the Pontryagin classes of a manifold, arising from the fundamental group. According to the Novikov conjecture, the higher signatures, which are certain numerical invariants of smooth manifolds, are homotopy invariants.

The conjecture has been proved for finitely generated abelian groups. It is not yet known whether the Novikov conjecture holds true for all groups.  There are no known counterexamples to the conjecture.

Precise formulation of the conjecture

Let  be a discrete group and  its classifying space, which is an Eilenberg–MacLane space of type , and therefore unique up to homotopy equivalence as a CW complex. Let

Novikov considered the numerical expression, found by evaluating the cohomology class in top dimension against the fundamental class , and known as a higher signature:

where  is the  Hirzebruch polynomial, or sometimes (less descriptively) as the  -polynomial. For each , this polynomial can be expressed in the Pontryagin classes of the manifold's tangent bundle.

Connection with the Borel conjecture

The Novikov conjecture is equivalent to the rational injectivity of the assembly map in L-theory. The 
Borel conjecture on the rigidity of aspherical manifolds is equivalent to the assembly map being an isomorphism.

References

John Milnor and James D. Stasheff, Characteristic Classes, Annals of Mathematics Studies 76, Princeton (1974).
Sergei P. Novikov, Algebraic construction and properties of Hermitian analogs of k-theory over rings with involution from the point of view of Hamiltonian formalism. Some applications to differential topology and to the theory of characteristic classes. Izv.Akad.Nauk SSSR, v. 34, 1970 I N2, pp. 253–288; II: N3, pp. 475–500. English summary in Actes Congr. Intern. Math., v. 2, 1970, pp. 39–45.

External links
Biography of Sergei Novikov
Novikov Conjecture Bibliography
Novikov Conjecture 1993 Oberwolfach Conference Proceedings, Volume 1
Novikov Conjecture 1993 Oberwolfach Conference Proceedings, Volume 2
2004 Oberwolfach Seminar notes on the Novikov Conjecture (pdf)
Scholarpedia article by S.P. Novikov (2010)
The Novikov Conjecture at the Manifold Atlas

Geometric topology
Homotopy theory
Conjectures
Unsolved problems in geometry
Surgery theory